Ten Talents may refer to:
Parable of the talents or minas, a parable in the Bible
Ten Talents (cookbook), a 1968 vegetarian and vegan cookbook